Indirect presidential elections were held in the Republic of China on March 22, 1954 to elect the President and Vice President. The vote took place at the Chung-Shan Hall in Taipei. Incumbent President Chiang Kai-shek was re-elected for the second term. The premier Chen Cheng was elected to be the Vice-President. These were the first elections that took place since the fall of the mainland to Mao Tse-tung's Chinese Communist Party in 1949.

Electors
The election was conducted by the National Assembly in its meeting place Chung-Shan Hall in Taipei. According to the Temporary Provisions against the Communist Rebellion, the term of the delegates who were elected during the 1947 Chinese National Assembly election was extended indefinitely until "re-election is possible in their original electoral district". In total, there were 1,578 delegates reported to the secretariat to attend this second session of the first National Assembly.

The 1947 Chinese National Assembly election elected 2,961 delegates for the 3,045 seats of the National Assembly. About half of them did not retreat to Taiwan with the government. The 1,578 delegates reported to this session barely passed the 50% requirement (1,523) of the National Assembly to hold a valid meeting.

Results

President

Vice-president

See also
History of Republic of China
President of the Republic of China
Vice President of the Republic of China

References

Presidential elections in Taiwan
1954 in Taiwan
1954 in China
China